Tang Hou Fai is a Macanese international footballer who plays for CD Lam Pak and the Macau national team.

International goals

References

Living people
1993 births
Macau footballers
Macau international footballers
Association football defenders